Jordi Ferrón Forné (born 15 August 1978) is a Spanish retired professional footballer who played mainly as a right back, and current manager of the women's team of RCD Espanyol.

Playing career
Born in Badalona, Barcelona, Catalonia, Ferrón was a product of FC Barcelona's prolific youth ranks at La Masia. After failing to be promoted to the first team he had a breakthrough season in 1999–2000, scoring seven La Liga goals to help Rayo Vallecano to their best finish ever – ninth; he started his career as a midfielder.

Subsequently, Ferrón moved to Real Zaragoza, but would be irregularly used in his new club, which also prompted a January 2002 loan to fellow league team Rayo. The player's contributions again proved helpful in an eventual midtable position, as the former were in turn relegated.

After an uneventful last year at Zaragoza, Ferrón joined Albacete Balompié in 2004–05, playing only one game in a season that also ended in top level relegation. In the following three Segunda División campaigns, however, he was an undisputed starter, appearing also at right back.

Ferrón signed with local side CF Badalona for 2008–09, his first season in Segunda División B after 242 matches in the top two tiers combined.

Coaching career
Ferrón retired in June 2015 at the age of 37, following one year as player-coach of amateurs UE Cabrera. Afterwards, also at the regional level, he managed the women's team of CE Seagull from his hometown.

On 10 December 2019, Ferrón signed as head coach of RCD Espanyol Femenino.

Honours
Zaragoza
Copa del Rey: 2001–02, 2003–04

Spain U23
Summer Olympic silver medal: 2000

References

External links

Queso Mecánico biography and stats 
 

1978 births
Living people
People from Badalona
Sportspeople from the Province of Barcelona
Spanish footballers
Footballers from Catalonia
Association football defenders
Association football midfielders
La Liga players
Segunda División players
Segunda División B players
FC Barcelona C players
FC Barcelona Atlètic players
Rayo Vallecano players
Real Zaragoza players
Albacete Balompié players
CF Badalona players
Spain youth international footballers
Spain under-21 international footballers
Spain under-23 international footballers
Olympic footballers of Spain
Olympic silver medalists for Spain
Footballers at the 2000 Summer Olympics
Olympic medalists in football
Medalists at the 2000 Summer Olympics
Spanish football managers
RCD Espanyol non-playing staff
Primera División (women) managers